Angela Boyd (born 1986) is a New Zealand international lawn bowler.

Bowls career
Angela's sister Mandy Boyd is also an international bowler.

She won two medals at the 2015 Asia Pacific Bowls Championships in Christchurch.

Boyd has won four national titles. In 2016, she won a bronze medal in the fours at the 2016 World Outdoor Bowls Championship in Christchurch with Katelyn Inch, Val Smith and Kirsten Edwards and a silver medal with Jo Edwards in the pairs.

In addition to her international success she has won the 2015 & 2016 pairs titles with her sister and five 'fours' titles (2011, 2016, 2018, 2019, 2021) at the New Zealand National Bowls Championships when bowling for the Burnside Bowls Club.

References

Living people
New Zealand female bowls players
1986 births